Nicolas-Jean Rouppe (in Dutch also: Nikolaus Joannes Rouppe) (baptised 17 April 1768 – 3 August 1838) was a Belgian liberal politician. He was the first burgomaster of Brussels after the Belgian independence in 1830.

Nicolas-Jean Rouppe was born in Rotterdam, and became a sub-deacon of the order of the Carmelites, but he broke radically with his faith in 1792, the day after Battle of Jemappes between the French revolutionary and Austrian armies on 6 November 1792. That year, he also provoked a riot by destroying the cross in the town hall of Leuven. Under the French occupation he became commissioner of the Dyle department. On 21 July 1803 he received Napoleon at the Castle of Laeken (Laeken).

After the Belgian revolution in 1830, he was a member of the national congress, later he became a member of the Belgian Chamber of Representatives. From 1830 up to 1838 he was burgomaster of Brussels. As the burgomaster of Brussels he receives the new king Leopold I of Belgium also at the Castle of Laeken on 21 July 1831, the day when Leopold swore allegiance to the Belgian constitution. Together with Pierre-Théodore Verhaegen, Nicolas-Jean Rouppe is also one of the initiators of the Université Libre de Bruxelles (ULB).

Rouppe died in Brussels, and is buried in the Laeken Cemetery. A square in Brussels, the Place Rouppe/Rouppeplein, is named after him.

See also
 List of mayors of the City of Brussels

Sources
 Du Bois, A., Les bourgmestres de Bruxelles, in : Revue de Belgique, April 1896, p. 365-396.
 Spreutels, J.-P., Une bonne action de Nicolas Rouppe sous l'occupation française, in : Cahiers Bruxellois, XIX, 1974, p. 84-85.

External links

1769 births
1838 deaths
19th-century Belgian politicians
Mayors of the City of Brussels
Members of the National Congress of Belgium
Burials at Laeken Cemetery

Politicians of the Austrian Netherlands
Clergy from Rotterdam